Heinrich Rehder (22 April 1887 – 19 December 1976) was a German athlete.  He competed at the 1908 Summer Olympics in London. In the 100 metres, Rehder took third place in his first round heat with a time of 11.8 seconds to be eliminated without advancing to the semifinals.

References

Sources
 
 
 
 Heinrich Rehder's profile at Sports Reference.com

1887 births
1976 deaths
German male sprinters
Olympic athletes of Germany
Athletes (track and field) at the 1908 Summer Olympics